= Christopher Sena =

American child rapist

- Born: 1966 (age 59–60)
- Status: Life in prison
- Criminal charges: Sexual assault, incest, sexual abuse of child, use of minors in porn,
- Penalty: 54 life sentences with parole possible after 337 years

Christopher Sena (born 1966) is a convicted sexual offender from Las Vegas, Nevada, United States. In February 2019 he was convicted and sentenced to 54 life terms for his crimes.

== Crime ==
Sena was charged with forcing his seven children in having sex with him, the mother, the step-mother, and the family dog for 12 years. His crimes were unveiled in 2014 after a SWAT team raided his trailer located to the south of Nellis Air Force Base on 18 September 2014. Information about the abuse was given by Deborah Sena to a family law attorney. Two of the children told police that he threatened to kill them or break their legs if they reported the crimes to the police. Terrie Sena, Christopher's ex-wife, was sentenced to life in prison with the possibility of parole in 2015.

In 2019, during Christopher's trial, Terrie Sena testified in court that the abuse started in the 1990s with her 12-year-old sister. Most victims were relatives of Sena; however, he also asked his children to bring friends over so that he could abuse them. One angry father tried to attack Christopher Sena in the courtroom.

== Sentencing ==
In February 2019, Sena was found guilty of multiple counts of sexual abuse and child abuse, and given 54 life prison sentences on 28 May 2019 by Judge Bill Kephart. Along with him, Deborah Sena and Terrie Sena, his ex-wives, were sent for 10 years imprisonment for 'willing participation'. He was found guilty of 95 out of 120 felony counts against him. He will be eligible for parole after serving 337 years.
